Masaya Onodera   is a Japanese mixed martial artist.

Mixed martial arts record

|-
| Loss
| align=center| 1-1-1
| Hiroyuki Kanno
| Submission (armbar)
| Shooto - Shooto
| 
| align=center| 2
| align=center| 2:31
| Tokyo, Japan
|
|-
| Draw
| align=center| 1-0-1
| Masato Suzuki
| Draw
| Shooto - Shooto
| 
| align=center| 3
| align=center| 3:00
| Tokyo, Japan
|
|-
| Win
| align=center| 1-0
| Keiichi Motomura
| KO
| Shooto - Shooto
| 
| align=center| 2
| align=center| 0:00
| Tokyo, Japan
|

See also
 List of male mixed martial artists

References

External links
 
 

Japanese male mixed martial artists
Living people
Year of birth missing (living people)